Dennis Adams (26 December 1934 – 14 January 1971) born in Mayfair, Johannesburg was a South African professional fly/bantam/featherweight boxer of the 1950s and '60s who won the Transvaal (South Africa) (White) bantamweight title, South African flyweight title, South African bantamweight title, and British Empire flyweight title, his professional fighting weight varied from , i.e. flyweight to , i.e. featherweight.

References

External links

Image - Dennis Adams

1934 births
1971 deaths
Bantamweight boxers
Featherweight boxers
Flyweight boxers
Place of death missing
Boxers from Johannesburg
South African male boxers